Benjamin Mbunga Kimpioka (born 21 February 2000) is a Swedish professional footballer who plays as a forward for Swiss club Luzern on loan from AIK. He is able to play as a winger or striker.

Club career
Mbunga Kimpioka signed for Sunderland from Swedish side IK Sirius as an academy player on 1 July 2016. He made his first team debut for Sunderland as a substitute in an EFL Trophy tie against Stoke City U21s on 4 September 2018. He made his league debut on 2 October 2018 in an EFL League One match against Peterborough United, coming on in the 92nd minute for Jerome Sinclair. He scored just 123 seconds into his third appearance; an EFL Trophy victory over Carlisle United on 10 October 2018. Kimpioka scored his first league goal on 23 November 2019, a 90th-minute equaliser, in a 1–1 home draw against Coventry.After a brief period away from the club, Kimpioka agreed a new 1 year-deal with an option of a further year. On 27 March 2021, Mbunga-Kimpioka joined National League side Torquay United on loan for the remainder of the 2020–21 season.

On 31 March 2022, Mbunga Kimpioka joined Allsvenskan side AIK for an undisclosed fee.

On 23 January 2023, Mbunga Kimpioka moved to Luzern in Switzerland on loan with an option to buy.

Personal life
Born in Sweden, Mbunga Kimpioka is of Congolese descent.

Honours
Sunderland
EFL Trophy: 2020–21

References

2000 births
People from Knivsta Municipality
Sportspeople from Uppsala County
Swedish people of Democratic Republic of the Congo descent
Swedish sportspeople of African descent
Living people
Swedish footballers
Sweden under-21 international footballers
Sweden youth international footballers
Association football forwards
Sunderland A.F.C. players
Torquay United F.C. players
Southend United F.C. players
AIK Fotboll players
FC Luzern players
English Football League players
National League (English football) players
Allsvenskan players
Swedish expatriate footballers
Expatriate footballers in England
Swedish expatriate sportspeople in England
Expatriate footballers in Switzerland
Swedish expatriate sportspeople in Switzerland